Smith McKay (1817 – December 8, 1889) was a prospector, merchant and political figure in Newfoundland. He represented Twillingate-Fogo in the Newfoundland and Labrador House of Assembly from 1869 to 1874 and from 1882 to 1889.

He was born in Pictou, Nova Scotia and came to Newfoundland in 1844, becoming a partner in a fishery supply and export business. McKay also was captain of a sealing ship and commanded a schooner which brought back oil from humpback whales. He was a partner in the Union Copper Mine, the first significant mining operation in the colony, with Charles James Fox Bennett. McKay was manager for the mine and also was involved in other mining ventures. In 1869, he married Susan Lock. He served as chairman of the Board of Works from 1883 to 1889. McKay died in office in St. John's in 1889.

References

External links 
 

Members of the Newfoundland and Labrador House of Assembly
Canadian miners
1817 births
1889 deaths
Newfoundland Colony people